Dystrichothorax amplipennis is a species of ground beetle in the subfamily Psydrinae. It was described by William John Macleay in 1871.

References

amplipennis
Beetles described in 1871